Denise Koegl (born August 3, 1988) is an Austrian former competitive figure skater. She is the 2008 Austrian national champion, the 2007 Austrian national silver medalist, and the junior national champion in 2002 and 2003.

Personal life 
Koegl was born on August 3, 1988 in Graz, Austria. She received a coaching diploma from the University of Vienna and the Bundessport Akademie Vienna. In July 2013, she graduated from Karl-Franzens University in Graz with a degree in media communications followed by a master's degree in 2016. She also studied English and psychology and philosophy. She graduated with the degree Magister philosophiae (Mag.phil.).

Career 
Koegl represented Eis Sport Club Graz. She was briefly coached by her mother, a former Austrian junior champion in ladies' singles, and then by her grandmother, Elli Koegl-Staerck, who was 6th in pair skating at the 1950 World Championships.
She also won the Euro Cup in her earlier years of skating.

Koegl sustained an ankle injury in August 2008 and underwent a complicated surgery. Since the recovery took much longer than expected and due to enduring pain in her right ankle, she decided to officially end her career in February 2010 after winning her 7th Styrian Championship title.

Koegl appeared at the 71. Hahnenkammrennen in Kitzbuehel, where she worked for Red Bull and various Austrian Sports magazines.

Programs

Competitive highlights 
JGP: Junior Grand Prix

References

External links

Navigation 

Austrian female single skaters
Living people
1988 births
Competitors at the 2009 Winter Universiade